Dormaa East District is one of the twelve districts in Bono Region, Ghana. Originally it was formerly part of the then-larger Dormaa District on 10 March 1989; until the eastern part of the district was split off to create Dormaa East District on 29 February 2008; thus the remaining part has been retained as Dormaa District (which it was later elevated to municipal district assembly status and has been renamed as Dormaa Central Municipal District on 28 June 2012). The district assembly is located in the western part of Bono Region and has Wamfie as its capital town.

List of settlements

Sources
 
 District: Dormaa East District

References

Districts of Bono Region